Oluf Pedersen may refer to:

 Oluf Pedersen (gymnast) (1878–1917), Danish gymnast
 Oluf Pedersen (politician) (1891–1970), Danish politician